The 9th of September Express was an overnight train, operated by the Turkish State Railways, from Basmane Terminal, İzmir to Ankara Central Station, Ankara. The name of the service refers to 9 September 1922, the date on which the Greek occupation of İzmir ended after World War I.

The journey from İzmir to Ankara took 13 hours and 25 minutes, while the journey from Ankara to İzmir took 13 hours and 6 minutes. The train serviced 6 provincial capitals: İzmir, Manisa, Balıkesir, Kütahya, Eskişehir and Ankara.

Along with the Karesi Express and İzmir Blue Train, the 9th of September Express was one of three trains to operate between Ankara and İzmir.

The Karesi Express operated between İzmir and Ankara since 1938. However the Karesi had no sleeping cars. Demand for more services between the two cities had been rising. So on April 1, 1972, the 9th of September Express made its first journey in about 14 hours. In the 1980s the İzmir Blue Train was added making 3 daily trains between İzmir and Ankara. On January 20, 2010, the 9th of September Express was discontinued, due to low ridership.

External links
Trains and Railways of Turkey - History of Turkish Railways

References

Passenger rail transport in Turkey
Named passenger trains of Turkey